Dechloromonas is a genus in the phylum Pseudomonadota (Bacteria).

Etymology
The name Dechloromonas derives from:Latin pref. de, from; New Latin noun chlorinum (from Greek adjective chlorōs, green), chlorine; New Latin pref. chloro-, pertaining to chlorine; Latin feminine gender noun monas (μονάς), unit, monad; New Latin feminine gender noun Dechloromonas, a dechlorinating monad.

Members of the genus Dechloromonas can be referred to as dechloromonads (viz. Trivialisation of names).

Species
The genus contains 4 species, namely
 D. agitata ( Achenbach et al. 2001,  (Type species of the genus).; Latin feminine gender participle adjective agitata, excited, agitated, highly active.)
 D. aromatica( Cavalier-Smith 2002)
 D. denitrificans ( Horn et al. 2005, ; New Latin participle adjective denitrificans, denitrifying.)
 D. hortensis ( Wolterink et al. 2005, ; Latin feminine gender adjective hortensis, of or belonging to a garden.)

See also
 Bacterial taxonomy
 Microbiology

References

Bacteria genera
Azonexaceae
Rhodocyclales
Betaproteobacteria